Ed Goedhart (born September 15, 1962) is an American politician who served in the Nevada Assembly from the 36th district from 2006 to 2012.

References

1962 births
Living people
Republican Party members of the Nevada Assembly